Wang Ting (born 9 November 1984 in Henan, China). She is the former China women's national volleyball team Opposite. She transferred to Guangdong Evergrande club, and helped the team win their first title in 2011–2012 season.

Career
Wang played at the 2013 Club World Championship with Guangdong Evergrande winning the bronze medal after defeating 3–1 to Voléro Zürich.

Clubs
  Henan Zhengzhou Hi-tech dist. (2002–2011, 2014–2017)
  Guangdong Evergrande (2011–2014)

Awards

Clubs
 2005–2006 Chinese Volleyball League —  Bronze Medal, with Guangdong Evergrande
 2011–2012 Chinese Volleyball League —  Champion, with Guangdong Evergrande
 2013 Club World Championship –  Bronze medal, with Guangdong Evergrande

References

External links
 FIVB Profile

Chinese women's volleyball players
Living people
1984 births
Volleyball players from Henan
Middle blockers
21st-century Chinese women